"Trembling Hands" is a song written and performed by Australian indie rock band The Temper Trap. It is included as the third track on their eponymously titled second studio album. It was released as a hype single, released the week before the album's release as the second single on May 9, 2012. The hype factor of the single was increased when it was used in promos for episodes 12 and 13 for the third series of Offspring.

Composition
With the chord progression of C-Gm7-Dm-Am, the song is written in the key of A phrygian.

Track listing

Chart performance

Release history

References

External links
 The Temper Trap Official Website

2011 songs
2012 singles
The Temper Trap songs